New Me, Same Us is the sixth studio album by Swedish electronic music band Little Dragon. It was released on 27 March 2020.

Background
The album is their first release through a new record deal with label Ninja Tune.

Singles
"Hold On" was the first single to be released from the album, with a remixed version of the track by Poté released on 28 January 2020. The second single from the album, "Are You Feeling Sad?", featuring Kali Uchis, was released on 4 March 2020.

Reviews

The album received generally favourable reviews upon its release.

Promotion
The band first released a new track called "Tongue Kissing" in November 2019 and confirmed a tour of Europe, Canada and US to take place from March 2020. However, by early spring 2020 the tour had to be postponed due to the outbreak of COVID-19 across Europe and North America. Despite the postponement of these dates, the band confirmed further tour dates for Europe in autumn 2020. Upon the release of the album on 27 March 2020, the band performed a special live show on YouTube from Gothenburg, Sweden.

Track listing

Charts

References

2020 albums
Little Dragon albums
Ninja Tune albums